Sydney Carlin may refer to:

 Sydney Carlin (politician) (born 1944), American politician
 Sydney Carlin (RAF officer) (1889–1941), British pilot